The 375th Bombardment Squadron is an inactive United States Air Force unit.  Its last assignment was with 308th Bombardment Wing stationed at Plattsburgh Air Force Base, New York.

History
Activated in early 1942 in Idaho as a long-range B-24 Liberator bombardment squadron under Second Air Force. For the next three months, little training occurred while the unit worked through its growing pains, resolving administrative and personnel acquisition difficulties.   Then a totally new problem arose....all but four personnel were transferred to the 330th Bombardment Group!   While active on paper, it was not until September that personnel were taken from the 39th Bombardment Group to form a headquarters cadre for the 308th Group, again making it a viable unit.   On 29  September the squadron was designated an Operational Training Unit (OTU) with Wendover Field, Utah as its home station.   The unit was fully manned by November, after receiving personnel from the 18th Replacement Wing.

During this time of trials and tribulations in forming a recognizable force, the flying echelon had transferred to Davis-Monthan Field, Arizona, on 20 June for incidental training.   The flight crews had been chosen and assigned, having completed their respective training schools; i.e., pilot, navigator, bombardier, engineer, radio and gunnery.

Members of the 375th had to complete three phases of training prior to moving overseas and entering combat.   The flying personnel spent most of October in transition training with the B-24, training combat crews as well.   Meanwhile, the ground echelon was acquiring, organizing and processing personnel and supplies at Wendover Field.

With the training complete and the personnel and supplies processed, the 308th Bomb Group and the 375th BS  officially transferred to Fourteenth Air Force in China early in 1943.   The air echelon began flying its 'brand new' B-24D Liberators from Morrison Field, Florida on 15 February 1943.   Traveling by way of the South Atlantic Transport Route through Central and South America, the Azores, Central Africa, Arabia and finally India; while the ground echelon traveled by ship across the Pacific Ocean.

The squadron arrived in India and made many trips over the 'Hump' between India and China to obtain gasoline, bombs, spare parts, and other items they needed to prepare for and sustain their combat operations.   The 375th supported Chinese ground forces; attacked airfields, coal yards, docks, oil refineries and fuel dumps in French Indochina; mined rivers and ports; bombed maintenance shops and docks at Rangoon, Burma; attacked Japanese shipping in the East China Sea, Formosa Straits, South China Sea and Gulf of Tonkin.

The squadron moved to India in June 1945, ferrying gasoline and supplies from there back into China.  The unit sailed for the United States, where it was inactivated on 6 January 1946.

Reactivated in Alaska in 1947 as a Strategic Air Command weather reconnaissance squadron.  Gathering weather information for combat readiness was an integrated part of strategic aerial reconnaissance. Weather recon, though, was a particularly loose term. There was a constant need for weather information, but weather flights were also a convenient cover for the more covert missions with RB-29 Superfortress photo-reconnaissance aircraft over the eastern frontier of the Soviet Union.  Inactivated in February 1951.

Reactivated a few months later in October with new B-47E Stratojet swept-wing medium bombers, capable of flying at high subsonic speeds and primarily designed for penetrating the airspace of the Soviet Union.  In the early late 1950s, the B-47 was considered to be reaching obsolescence and was being phased out of SAC's strategic arsenal. B-47s began being sent to AMARC at Davis-Monthan in July 1959 and the squadron went non-operational.  Was inactivated on 25 June 1961.

Lineage
 Constituted 375th Bombardment Squadron (Heavy) on 28 January 1942
 Activated on 15 April 1942
 Inactivated on 6 January 1946
 Redesignated 375th Reconnaissance Squadron (Very Long Range, Weather) on 16 September 1947.
 Activated on 15 October 1947
 Inactivated on 21 February 1951
 Redesignated 375th Bombardment Squadron (Medium) on 4 October 1951
 Activated on 10 October 1951.
 Discontinued, and inactivated, on 25 June 1961.

Assignments
 308th Bombardment Group, 15 April 1942 – 6 January 1946
 7th Weather (later 2107th Air Weather) Group, 15 October 1947 – 21 February 1951
 308th Bombardment Group, 10 October 1951
 Attached to 21st Air Division, 10 October 1951-17 April 1952
 308th Bombardment Wing, 16 June 1952 – 25 June 1961
 Not operational, 15 July 1959-25 June 1961

Stations

 Gowen Field, Idaho, 15 April 1942
 Davis-Monthan Field, Arizona, 18 June 1942
 Alamogordo Army Airfield, New Mexico, 24 July 1942
 Davis-Monthan Field, Arizona, 28 August 1942
 Wendover Field, Utah, 1 October 1942
 Pueblo Army Air Base, Colorado, 1 December 1942 – 2 January 1943
 Chengkung Airfield, China, 20 March 1943
 Hsinching Airfield, China, 18 February 1945
 Rupsi Airfield, India, 27 June-14 October 1945

 Camp Kilmer, New Jersey, 5–6 January 1946
 Ladd Field, Alaska Territory, 15 October 1947
 One flight operated from Fairfield-Suisun AAFId, California, and later from Shemya AFB, Alaska Territory, 15 October 1947-15 May 1949
 Eielson AFB, Alaska Territory, 6 March 1949 – 21 February 1951
 Forbes AFB, Kansas, 10 October 1951
 Hunter AFB, Georgia, 17 April 1952
 Plattsburgh AFB, New York, 15 July 1959 – 25 June 1961

Aircraft
 B-18 Bolo, 1942
 B-24 Liberator, 1942–1945
 B/RB/WB-29 Superfortress, 1947–1951
 C-47 Skytrain, 1947–1951
 B-29 Superfortress, 1951–1952
 B-47 Stratojet, 1953–1959

References

 

Military units and formations established in 1942
Bombardment squadrons of the United States Air Force
Bombardment squadrons of the United States Army Air Forces